"Tofu-dreg project" is a phrase used in  the Chinese-speaking world to describe a poorly constructed building, sometimes called just "Tofu buildings". The phrase was coined by Zhu Rongji, the former premier of the People's Republic of China, on a 1998 visit to Jiujiang City, Jiangxi Province to describe a poorly-built set of flood dykes in the Yangtze River. The phrase is notably used referring to buildings collapsed in the 2008 Sichuan earthquake disaster.

In China, the term tofu dregs (the pieces left over after making tofu) is widely used as a metaphor for shoddy work, hence the implication that a "tofu-dreg project" is a poorly executed project. 

The prevalence of “tofu projects” is due to rampant corruption and graft in China, as "project money is skimmed off the top for and by officials, leaving less funding for quality materials, qualified staff, and acceptable workmanship" while "projects are often granted to companies that have more political ties than qualifications". Furthermore "tribute projects" are often rushed for completion in order to mark a state anniversary. For instance in 2007, a bridge in Hunan Province, where work was expedited so it could open on the 50th anniversary of the founding of the local prefecture, collapsed during construction, killing 64 people. Lastly, local governments rely on the revenues arising from construction including land sales and transfer fees, so they have incentives to promote rapid and unfettered growth, including turning a blind eye to substandard construction. 

After visiting China in early 2011, Canadian journalist Lawrence Solomon stated that many Chinese people "fear that a 'tofu dam' might fail, leading to hundreds of thousands of downstream victims."

According to Chinese architect Li Hu, tofu-dreg projects in China are vastly outnumbered by buildings without construction flaws. Li said that in most cases, ill-constructed buildings don't collapse but merely have a reduced lifespan or leakages.

2008 Wenchuan earthquake

During the 2008 Wenchuan earthquake, many schoolhouses fell down, and many students died. These buildings have been used to exemplify tofu-dreg projects. The collapses were linked to allegations of corruption in the construction of Chinese schools.

On May 15, 2008, Geoffery York of The Globe and Mail reported that the shoddily constructed buildings are commonly called "tofu buildings" because builders cut corners by replacing steel rods with thin iron wires for concrete reinforcement; using inferior grade cement, if any at all; and using fewer bricks than they should. One local was quoted in the article as saying that "the supervising agencies did not check to see if it met the national standards."

The state-controlled media has largely ignored the tofu-dregs schoolhouses, under directives from the propaganda bureau's instructions. Parents, volunteers, and journalists who have questioned authorities have been detained and threatened. In order to silence the issue, riot police officers broke up protests by parents; the authorities set up cordons around the schools; and officials ordered the Chinese news media to stop reporting on school collapses.

References

Building collapses in China
Special idioms of modern Chinese language
Civil engineering
Engineering failures